Östman is a Swedish-language surname. Notable people with the surname include:

Arnold Östman (born 1939), Swedish conductor and music director
Bror Östman (1928–1992), Swedish ski jumper
Peter Östman (born 1961), Swedish politician

Swedish-language surnames